Martyn Godfrey (April 17, 1949 — March 10, 2000) was an English-Canadian author of children's fantasy and science fiction books. Born in Birmingham, England, he moved to Toronto, Ontario when he was eight. Godfrey graduated from University of Alberta in 1974 with a teacher education degree.

Godfrey began writing children's stories in the 1980s. In 1989, he was the Edmonton Public Library's writer-in-residence, and that same year won the Geoffrey Bilson Award for his book, Mystery in the Frozen Lands. He became one of Canada's most popular and prolific children's writers. He went on to sell millions of books, both in Canada and throughout the rest of the world.

In 2000, he died of complications due to liver disease. After his death, the Young Alberta Book Society began presenting an annual Martyn Godfrey Young Writers Award in his name.

Novels
 The Vandarian Incident (1981)
 The Day the Sky Exploded (1981)
 Alien Wargames (1984)
 Spin Out (1984)
 The Beast (1984)
 Fire! Fire! (1985)
 Ice Hawk (1985)
 The Last War (1986)
 Plan B Is Total Panic (1986)
 Do You Want Fries With That? (1986)
 Rebel Yell (1987)
 It Seemed Like A Good Idea at the Time (1987)
 More Than Weird (1987)
 Wild Night (1987)
 Baseball Crazy (1987)
 Mystery in the Frozen Lands (1988)
 Why Just Me? (1989)
 Just Call Me Boom Boom (1994)
 Meet You in the Sewer
 There's a Cow in My Swimming Pool
 The Great Science Fair Disaster
 The Jaws Mob series
 Ms. Teeny-Wonderful Series:
Here She Is, Ms. Teeny Wonderful! (1984)
It Isn't Easy Being Ms. Teeny Wonderful (1987)
Send in Ms Teeny-Wonderful (1988)
 I Spent My Summer Vacation in Space (1990)
Wally Stutzgummer, Super Bad Dude (1992)
 Please Remove Your Elbow From My Ear (1993)
 Mall-Rats (1995)
 The Things (1995)
 Don't Worry About Me, I'm Just Crazy (1995)

References

External links
TrackO.com
Famous Albertans
fantasticfiction
Martyn Godfrey Young Writers Award

1949 births
2000 deaths
People from Birmingham, West Midlands
Deaths from liver disease
University of Alberta alumni
Writers from Toronto
20th-century British short story writers
Canadian male short story writers
20th-century Canadian novelists
20th-century Canadian short story writers
Canadian children's writers
Canadian male novelists
Canadian fantasy writers
Canadian science fiction writers
20th-century Canadian male writers
English male non-fiction writers
British emigrants to Canada
20th-century English male writers